Romano Bruno Mussolini (26 September 1927 – 3 February 2006) was an Italian jazz pianist, painter, and film producer. He was the fourth child and youngest son of Benito Mussolini.

Early life and education
Romano Mussolini was native of Villa Carpena, Forlì (Emilia-Romagna), Romano Mussolini studied music as a child, playing classical pieces with his father on the violin. After World War II, he started playing jazz under the assumed name "Romano Full".

Musical career 
His playing style has been described as "like a slightly melancholic Oscar Peterson. Occasionally inspired, he was always efficient; he made the refrains run on time."

Personal life 
In 1962, Mussolini married Maria Scicolone, the younger sister of actress Sophia Loren. They had two daughters, Elisabetta and her elder sister Alessandra Mussolini, who was a member of the European Parliament, and led an Italian far-right party often described as neofascist, Alternativa Sociale. Romano Mussolini composed the party's official anthem, "The Pride of Being Italian".

With his second wife, the actress Carla Maria Puccini, he had a third daughter, Rachele, named after his mother Rachele Mussolini. The younger Rachele has served as a member of the city council of Rome. 

Mussolini was very reserved about his family history. It was only in 2004 that he published a book, entitled Il Duce, mio padre (The Leader, my father), followed by a similar book in 2005, collecting personal memories and accounts of private confidences and discussions with his father.

Death
Romano Mussolini died in 2006, aged 78, in a hospital in Rome from heart problems.

Selected discography
 Mirage (1974)
 Soft & Swing (1996)
 The Wonderful World of Louis (2001)
 Timeless Blues (2002)
 Music Blues (2002)
 Romano Piano & Forte (2002)
 Jazz Album (2003)
 Napule 'nu quarto 'e luna (2003)
 Alibi perfetto (2004) soundtrack

References

Books

External links
Mussolini's jazz pianist son dies from BBC News
Singer Helen Merrill recalls Romano Mussolini

E' morto Romano Mussolini, il figlio jazzista del duce from La Repubblica 

1927 births
2006 deaths
People from Forlì
20th-century Italian painters
Italian male painters
21st-century Italian painters
Children of national leaders
Italian jazz pianists
Italian male pianists
Romano
20th-century pianists
20th-century Italian male musicians
20th-century Italian male artists
21st-century Italian male artists
Male jazz musicians